Toby Esterhase is a fictional character who appears in several of John le Carré's spy novels that feature George Smiley, including Tinker Tailor Soldier Spy, The Honourable Schoolboy, Smiley's People, and The Secret Pilgrim. Esterhase also makes a cameo appearance in Le Carré's A Legacy of Spies.

Esterhase is an intelligence officer in The Circus, le Carre's fictionalized version of MI6. He is the head of the Lamplighters, the section of The Circus responsible for surveillance and wiretapping. Hungarian by birth, Esterhase is an Anglophile with pretensions of being a British gentleman. He is the Circus' resident ne'er-do-well, often involving himself in either morally questionable or outright criminal plots, although his superiors look the other way due to his high level of competence and loyalty to the service. Initially something of an antagonist to Smiley, due to his loyalty to Smiley's bureaucratic nemesis Percy Alleline, Esterhase ultimately switches allegiances and becomes one of Smiley's top lieutenants, aiding him in a number of high-profile intelligence missions.

Character

Esterhase is exceptionally short; he's called "Tiny Tobe" by colleague Connie Sachs and known around The Circus as "Snow White" for his meticulously maintained white hair, which he covers with a net when he sleeps. He further gained the nickname "Our shadow foreign secretary" from Bill Haydon. Esterhase is known for multiple eccentricities, including "dressing like a male model," washing his own clothes rather than having them laundered, never smiling, and sending all of his colleagues bottles of alcohol for Christmas. He has a unique manner of speech which vacillates between ultra-correct English and unusual syntax. Esterhase's former espionage partner, Peter Guillam, indicates that he's something of a polyglot, musing "Toby spoke no known language perfectly, but he spoke them all." In The Secret Pilgrim, though, he is seen to speak fluent Hungarian to a pair of fellow expatriates, during which the narrator Ned notes that he becomes more animate and expressive than when speaking any other language. Guillam further recounts that Esterhase appears impervious to fear, recalling an incident in which he stopped to tip hotel employees while fleeing would-be captors. 

During the events of Tinker, Tailor, Soldier, Spy, Esterhase has a son at Westminster and a daughter at medical school.  He is married, but has a reputation as a womanizer. No information is ever given about his wife or the circumstances of his marriage.

Despite his odd behaviour, Esterhase proves himself to be a valuable spy and extremely competent at his job; characters often find themselves conflicted between being put off by his eccentricity and being glad to have him on their side. He has also endeared himself to those around him due to his genuine affection for Smiley, even though they sometimes clash professionally, and his unwavering loyalty to England in general and the Circus in particular. Esterhase is particularly adept as the head of Lamplighters, the division of the Circus responsible for surveillance, wiretapping, and maintaining safe houses. Esterhase personally assembled the Lamplighters by recruiting housewives, vagabonds, and other individuals whom no one would suspect of espionage work, and honing them into an efficient, tightly-knit unit that becomes something of a surrogate family for them. He runs the Lamplighters from an office in the back of a launderette, which functions as a cover for their base of operations. 

Easterhase is motivated by a desire to be accepted by his peers as a true English gentleman, a weakness exploited by Percy Alleline to coax Toby into supporting him in a coup against Control, the head of the Circus. Smiley later uses the same desire for acceptance to convince Esterhase to switch alliances and support him in exposing Alleline as a fraud whose arrogance has blinded him to the presence of a mole in his inner circle. Esterhase also has a penchant for making extra money on the side through small-time criminal enterprises, nominally selling forged art. Those around him look the other way due to his competence and value as a spy.

History
George Smiley recruited Esterhase (Eszterházy — Hungarian spelling — or Esterházy — German spelling), a Hungarian, in Vienna sometime around World War II, when he was a starving student living in the ruins of a museum of which his late uncle had been curator. (Esterházy is the name of a historically prominent Hungarian noble family; evidently, Toby Esterhase either was or pretended to be a member of that family, though this is never explicitly mentioned). He was paired with Peter Guillam on overseas missions, which had varying degrees of success, including a posting in Bern, Switzerland in which they were suspected of seditious activities by local police and had to flee the country. He eventually rose to be head of the Lamplighter division sometime prior to 1973.

When the Circus became polarised between supporters of the ailing Chief, "Control", and his rival, Percy Alleline, Esterhase gravitated towards Alleline out of ambition, forgetting his past loyalty to Smiley, who was Control's supporter. During Smiley's attempt to salvage Control's career and maintain control of the Circus, Esterhase is one of the first people Smiley appeals to, citing their past friendship; Esterhase demurs, citing Control's habit of allowing younger personnel to mistreat him. After Control is ousted and Alleline installed as the new chief of the Circus, Esterhase, along with Bill Haydon and Roy Bland, forms part of the "magic circle," an elite group of spies with access to the Soviet intelligence operation code-named "Witchcraft," which receives Soviet intelligence from the mysterious spy "Merlin."

Esterhase is one of the five high-ranking Circus officers Control suspects of being a Soviet mole.  After Control's death, Esterhase embraces the new Alleline regime and allows his Lamplighters to be almost entirely given over to serving Operation Witchcraft, which is in fact nothing but a disinformation campaign orchestrated by Soviet spymaster Karla. Esterhase's own role is to pretend to be a Soviet mole when meeting with the Soviets. They know he is not, but his pretense provides a cover story for Alleline, Bland, and Esterhase himself, justifying his role as a courier between the real mole, Haydon, and his Soviet controllers.

After patient investigation, Smiley decides to interview Esterhase in private, in a safe house meeting to which he has been lured on a pretext by Peter Guillam. After realizing that he's been taken advantage of, and that Smiley has the official backing of Whitehall, Esterhase helps Smiley entrap the real mole, Bill Haydon.
In the aftermath of Haydon's exposure, Esterhase and the rest of the magic circle are disgraced.

In The Honourable Schoolboy, it is revealed that Esterhase, unlike Alleline and Bland, has managed to retain a position in the Circus, albeit in a diminished role as a simple surveillance agent, accompanying Smiley's higher-ranking lieutenants to record their conversations with witnesses and sources. 

In Smiley's People, he has retired from the Circus and opened a second-rate art gallery in London, whose wares are of dubious provenance.  An old Circus agent, Vladimir, approaches him, asking for help with a private operation, but Esterhase refuses. When Vladimir is later killed, Esterhase somewhat shamefacedly recounts their meeting to Smiley.

When Vladimir's death leads Smiley to a possible means of trapping Karla, he recruits Esterhase for an espionage operation in Berne, to capture and interrogate one of Karla's agents.  Esterhase serves as Smiley's field commander, reactivating the Lamplighters to follow, investigate, and eventually trap the Soviet spy in question—to use Smiley's theatrical analogy, Smiley writes the show, and Esterhase produces it—a job he performs superbly.  He is also with Smiley in Berlin when Karla defects to the West and surrenders himself to Circus custody.

Esterhase is a minor character in the short-story collection The Secret Pilgrim, occasionally referenced by the book's narrator, Ned. The book reveals that, between the time of The Honourable Schoolboy and Smiley's People, he became the head of the Circus' Vienna office. Esterhase is one of the central characters in a farcical vignette in which he gets rid of a charlatan—an exiled Hungarian professor based in Munich, who provides the British with virtually worthless information—by successfully convincing the CIA that he is a dauntless anti-Communist hero. Although Ned is infuriated by the incident, Smiley dismisses it as amusing. Esterhase reappears at the end of the novel to attend a speech given by Smiley, standing out from the crowd in an ostentatious tuxedo.

Esterhase is briefly mentioned in a cameo role in A Legacy of Spies where he, together with Percy Alleline and Roy Bland, meet Peter Guillam at the field dispatch office at Heathrow Airport during a flashback; whether Toby is still alive in the present day is not revealed.

Inspiration
According to Adam Sisman, the character of Esterhase was partly inspired by the Hungarian emigre and book publisher André Deutsch:

In other media
Bernard Hepton played Esterhase in the BBC television dramatisations of Tinker Tailor Soldier Spy and Smiley's People. In the former, Hepton played Esterhase as speaking with a received pronunciation accent, but in Smiley's People, Hepton reverted to an Eastern European accent for the role.

Charles Kay played Esterhase in the BBC radio dramatisations of Tinker Tailor Soldier Spy and Smiley's People.

David Dencik played Esterhase in the 2011 film version of Tinker Tailor Soldier Spy. Dencik's Esterhase spoke with a subtle but difficult-to-place Eastern European accent. The details of Esterhase's past are altered slightly in the film. In the film, it was Control, rather than Smiley, who first recruited Esterhase in Vienna. When Smiley confronts Esterhase about Operation Witchcraft, he states that Esterhase was a "wanted man" at the time of his recruitment and implies that Esterhase is still a fugitive. Although it is not specified why or by whom Esterhase is wanted, it is suggested that his fugitive status may have to do with his "war experience," which Smiley cryptically states Esterhase "survived [...] because of [his] ability to change sides, serve any master."

References

Characters in British novels of the 20th century
Fictional British secret agents
Fictional Hungarian people
John le Carré